Admiral Sir Trevor Alan Soar,  (born 21 March 1957) is a retired Royal Navy officer who served as Commander-in-Chief Fleet from 2009 to 2012.

Early life
Soar was born in Belper and educated at Loughborough Grammar School. He joined the Royal Navy in 1975, attending Britannia Royal Naval College at Dartmouth.

Naval career
He went on to command the frigate  from 1997 to 1998. He next appointment was ashore as Director of Naval Staff Duties at the Ministry of Defence from September 2000 to August 2002. Next appointed as commanding officer of the aircraft carrier  from 2002 to 2004. Trevor Soar was appointed Capability Manager (Precision Attack) in 2004 in the rank of rear admiral and was promoted to Chief of Materiel (Fleet), Defence Equipment & Support in the rank of vice admiral in 2007.

Soar was promoted to admiral and appointed as Commander-in-Chief Fleet and Allied Maritime Component Commander, Northwood, on 10 June 2009. He also held the honorary position of Vice-Admiral of the United Kingdom from 2009 to 2012. In an October 2012 article, the Sunday Times alleged that Soar was among several retired military leaders who had offered to lobby and influence MPs and government defence ministers on behalf of arms firms.  He resigned, after admitting he had to be slightly careful of lobbying ministers. "There's no reason I can't see them but there's again some criteria on that." However he claimed that he had not broken Whitehall rules.

Private military career
After leaving the military, Soar has worked for several private arms or security companies. In 2012, he took up roles with British Maritime Security, Vessel Protection Services and Babcock International.

Honours
Knight Commander of the Order of the Bath (KCB) in the 2009 New Year Honours.
Officer of the Order of the British Empire (OBE)
Honorary doctorate from Heriot-Watt University 2005

Personal life
In 1978 Soar married Anne Matlock. They have two sons (Gareth and David), who attended Denstone College. They live in Boylestone in Derbyshire. He is President of Royal Navy Rugby Union.

References

External links

 Official biography of Trevor Soar

|-

|-

Royal Navy admirals
Royal Navy submarine commanders
Officers of the Order of the British Empire
Knights Commander of the Order of the Bath
Deputy Lieutenants of Staffordshire
Living people
Military personnel from Derbyshire
People educated at Loughborough Grammar School
People from Belper
1957 births
Graduates of Britannia Royal Naval College